Agni Rekha is a 1973 Bollywood drama film directed by Mahesh Kaul. The film stars Bindu and Sanjeev Kumar.

Plot
Suresh's (Sanjeev Kumar) wife dies due to some illness leaving behind her mother (Durga Khote) and two children, Chunnu and Munni. Time passed kids grow older. Durga Khote wants Suresh to get married again but Suresh hesitates. Khote's Brother wants his daughter (Bindu) to marry Suresh as he has lot of wealth. But Suresh does not like her. Meanwhile, Munni and Chuunu's teacher goes on month tour leaving behind temporary teacher Nirmala (Sharda). Kids very soon like Nirmala and come very close to her. Suresh after seeing love and affection of Nirmala towards kids start liking her. She too likes Suresh but her past stops her to admit her love towards Suresh. She writes her past in diary and gives to Suresh. In past she had been raped by her father's friend's son. Her drunken father kills him and is imprisoned. The rape leads to Nirmala's pregnancy and she keeps the child in an orphanage. After knowing her past Suresh still loves her and is ready to accept with her child.  Suresh tells Khote that he wants to marry Nirmala but Khote after knowing that she mother of child without marriage does not want this marriage to happen. Suresh gives Nirmala's diary to Khote but she does not read it and keeps in locker. Khote asks Nirmala to move out of Suresh life as this marriage would only bring problems to his life. Nirmala leaves city and goes to some Baba in temple and works there. Kids after knowing that there would be new mother has left them run away from home to find Nirmala. On other side Bindu moves in Suresh's house to get marry to him. Suresh tries to find kids but could not. Kids reach the same temple where Nirmala stays and Nirmala informs Suresh that kids are with her. Suresh reaches temple to bring back kids and also asks Nirmala to come back to him for sake of kids. Nirmala agrees to come back only on one condition that she will stay as maid in house and Suresh should marry someone else. Suresh unwillingly agrees to her condition. Suresh's marriage is fixed with Bindu. Depressed and disappointed Suresh becomes alcoholic. Now even Khote realizes that Nirmala and Suresh are true soulmates and Nirmala is best mom for the kids. Finally Bindu leaves with her boyfriend Asrani on day of marriage knowing that Suresh will never give her true love. And Khote accepts Nirmala and Suresh relationship.

Cast
G. Asrani
Bindu
Durga Khote
Sanjeev Kumar
Sharada

Soundtrack
All songs were written by Kavi Pradeep.

External links
 

1973 films
1970s Hindi-language films
1973 drama films
Films scored by Kalyanji Anandji
Hindi-language drama films